Hlazove is a village in Shostka Raion, Sumy Oblast, Ukraine.

References 

Villages in Shostka Raion